The 1980–81 season was Football Club Internazionale Milano's 72nd in existence and 65th consecutive season in the top flight of Italian football.

Summary 
During summer the club acquired Herbert Prohaska from Austria Vienna the first foreign transfer since 1966. In Coppa Italia the squad was early eliminated through September despite defeating city rivals A.C. Milan.  As incumbent champions the team closed the first half of the season as leader, however, for the second half the club collapsed to the 4th place in League far behind Juventus and A.S. Roma. The campaign saw the league debut of club legend Giuseppe Bergomi on February against Como. Meanwhile, in European Cup after 8 years of absence in the continental tournament the squad advanced to the semifinals being defeated by Real Madrid. Also, Alessandro Altobelli finishes the campaign as club topscorer included 12 goals in League.

Squad

Transfers

Competitions

Serie A

League table

Results by round

Matches

Coppa Italia

First round

Matches

European Cup

First round

Eightfinals

Quarterfinals

Semifinals

Statistics

Player statistics 
Appearances and goals are referred to domestic league.

References

Sources 
- RSSSF Italy 1980/81

Inter Milan seasons
Internazionale Milano